Ourilândia do Norte is a municipality in the state of Pará in the Northern region of Brazil.

The city is served by Ourilândia do Norte Airport.

See also
List of municipalities in Pará

References

Municipalities in Pará